NASCAR Rumble is a racing video game created by Electronic Arts for the PlayStation. Players race through 18 different courses set in six different areas collecting powerups to aid them. The game is a departure from many NASCAR games, as it is an arcade racer featuring various tracks and Mario Kart-esque powerups. A non-NASCAR licensed sequel was made for the PlayStation 2, called Rumble Racing. There are drivers from the then Winston Cup Series and Craftsman Truck Series, as well as legend racers and fictional trucks.

Gameplay 
In NASCAR Rumble, the main object of the game is to win a race or series of races against one to five opponents. They race in normal or souped-up stock cars from the at-the-time NASCAR Winston Cup Series (including Adam Petty, which uses his NASCAR Busch Series car, as he had yet to debut in Winston Cup in 1999), in addition to several Craftsman Truck Series drivers (all from their respective 1999 season), unlockable past NASCAR legends (all of them using Dodge Charger Daytona bodies), and bonus vehicles. Another feature in the game includes the voice of actor Jess Harnell, who talks to the player during a race. The game also features three original songs by guitarist Derek Trucks.

Game modes

Single race 
In a single race, players race one race on any track of their choice. They can choose between one and eight circuits and one to five opponents. The option to select AI opponent(s) is also available if enabled in the game options.

Championship 
In a championship, the player can participate in a championship consisting of three rounds, each set in a track sharing the location. Depending on how well the player does in each race, they are rewarded with ten points for a win, eight for second, six for third, four for fourth, two for fifth, and one for sixth. A running total is kept, and final standing position is based on the total points earned in all three races. If the player finishes in first, they receive a trophy and unlock the legend championship in that series.

Championships can also be played in "Cyberteam" mode where there are three teams with two players on each. The team members combine their points and the standings are based on both members, so it can be a good check of strength for an expert player. There is also "co-op" mode, where two human players are on a team.

There is also a "Legend" mode, where the player can unlock a legendary NASCAR driver in a championship against the legend and four "regular" drivers. However, the player still must finish first in the championship, regardless of the legend's final position in the standings.

Showdown 
"Showdown" is a one-lap shootout against an opponent of the player's choice. The player also chooses the track and power-up density.

Time trial 
In a time trial, the player has four laps to get the track and/or lap record for a track of their choice. Track records are "official" if only four laps are run, regardless of power-up density. There are a maximum a five track records kept for each track, but only one lap record.

Reception 

The game received favorable reviews according to the review aggregation website GameRankings. Eric Bratcher of NextGen said of the game, "Don't expect an ultra-realistic racing simulation here. It's more like the NASCAR-licensed version of Road Rash. And it's great."

See also 
 Rumble Racing

Notes

References

External links 
 

2000 video games
EA Sports games
NASCAR video games
PlayStation (console) games
PlayStation (console)-only games
North America-exclusive video games
Racing video games
Video games developed in the United States